Michał Szeliga (born 24 September 1995) is a Polish professional footballer who plays as defender for Lubań Maniowy.

References

External links

1995 births
Sportspeople from Nowy Sącz
Living people
Association football defenders
Polish footballers
Sandecja Nowy Sącz players
Rozwój Katowice players
I liga players
II liga players